Mohammad Ebrahimi (born 1 November 1986) is an Iranian footballer who plays as a forward for Pars Jonoubi in the Persian Gulf Pro League

Club career
Ebrahimi joined Tractor after spending the previous season at Mokhaberat Shiraz in the Azadegan League. Ebrahimi joined Gostaresh Foolad in December 2014 in exchange for Mehrdad Bayrami. Ebrahimi returned to Tractor in the summer of 2016.

Club career statistics

 Assist Goals

International career
He made his debut against Albania in April 2012 under Carlos Queiroz.

Honours
Tractor
Persian Gulf Pro League : 2011–12 Runner up , 2012–13 Runner up , 2014–15 Runner up
Hazfi Cup (1) : 2013–14 , 2016-17 Runner up

Individual'
 Persian Gulf Pro League Team of the Year (1) : 2015-16

References

External links
Persian League profile

1984 births
Living people
People from Kazerun
Iranian footballers
Iran international footballers
Association football forwards
Tractor S.C. players
Gostaresh Foulad F.C. players
Sepahan S.C. footballers
Azadegan League players
Persian Gulf Pro League players
Pars Jonoubi Jam players
Sportspeople from Fars province